Ian Johnston may refer to:
Ian Johnston (cricketer) (born 1948), former Irish cricketer
Ian Johnston (doctor) (1930–2001), pioneer of reproductive medicine in Australia
Ian Johnston (field hockey) (1929–2020), Canadian field hockey player
Ian Johnston (police commissioner) (born 1952), Police and Crime Commissioner for Gwent Police
Ian Johnston (police officer) (born 1945), former Chief Constable of British Transport Police
Ian Johnston (rowing) (born 1947), Australian Olympic rower
Ian Johnston (rugby league), Australian rugby league footballer
Ian Johnston (soccer), Australian footballer; see Australia national soccer team records and statistics
Ian C. Johnston (born 1938), Canadian professor and translator of classical works
Ian R. Johnston (born 1943), Australian human factors engineer and road safety advocate

See also
Iain Johnstone (born 1943), British film critic
 Iain M. Johnstone, statistician
Ian Johnstone (disambiguation)
Ian Johnson (disambiguation)